Clel E. Baudler (born April 4, 1939) is an American politician who served as a member of the Iowa House of Representatives from the 20th district. A Republican, he was first elected to the House in 1998 and assumed office in 1999.

Career 
Baudler was born and raised in Fontanelle, Iowa and resides in Greenfield. He served as a state trooper with the Iowa State Patrol for 32 years.

In the House, Baudler served on several committees, including the Agriculture, Environmental Protection, Government Oversight, and Natural Resources committees. He also serves as the chair of the Public Safety committee. He is on the board of directors of the National Rifle Association. Baudler did not seek re-election in 2018 and was succeeded by Ray Sorensen.

References

External links

 Representative Clel Baudler official Iowa General Assembly site
 
 Financial information (state office) at the National Institute for Money in State Politics
 Profile at Iowa House Republicans

1939 births
Living people
People from Adair County, Iowa
American state police officers
Republican Party members of the Iowa House of Representatives
People from Greenfield, Iowa
21st-century American politicians